Jojo is a given name, surname, nickname and stage name of several people and fictional characters. 

Jojo, JoJo or Jo Jo may also refer to:

Music
 JoJo (album), by JoJo, 2004
 "Jojo" (Boz Scaggs song), 1980
 "Jojo", a song by Jacques Brel, 1977
 "Jo Jo", a song by The King Brothers, 1966
 "Jojo", a song by Jeff Phillips, 1978
 "Jo Jo", a song by Marvin & Johnny, 1954
 "Jo Jo", a song by Gino Vannelli from the 1974 album Powerful People
 "Jo Jo", a song by Shinee from the 2009 album 2009, Year of Us 
 "JoJo (Sono Chi no Sadame)", a song by Hiroaki "Tommy" Tominaga, 2012
 "Jo-Jo", a song by Tony! Toni! Toné! from the 1990 album The Revival

People
Jojó (Jorge Miguel Moreira Larrouy Fernandes, born 1970), a Mozambican footballer 
JoJo (singer) (Joanna Noëlle Levesque, born 1990), an American singer, songwriter, and actress
Jojo (Bengali singer) (Jojo Nathaniel)
Miss Jojo (Josiane Uwineza, born 1982), a Rwandan R&B singer

Other uses
 Jōjō Castle, in Kasugai, Aichi Prefecture, Japan
 JoJo Lake (Ontario), in Canada
 Jojo, a 1988 novel by Roger Caron
 JOJO (Turkish children's channel)
 Jojos, potato wedges

See also

JoJo's Bizarre Adventure (disambiguation)
JoJo Maman Bébé, a maternity wear and baby clothing retailer